The Mad Marechiaro (Italian: Il Folle di Marechiaro) is a 1952 Italian film directed by Roberto Roberti and starring Aldo Silvani, Polidor and Diana Dei. The film had a difficult production history and was the director's last film. It was begun during the Second World War and not completed until 1950, before being released two years later. Roberti's son Sergio Leone assisted him as assistant director and played a role in the film.

Cast
 Aldo Silvani - The madman
 Polidor - The old fisherman
 Diana Dei
 Tatiana Farnese as The vamp  
 Sergio Leone as American Soldier  
 Albino Principe

External links
 

1952 films
1950s Italian-language films
Films set in Naples
Films directed by Roberto Roberti
Italian drama films
1952 drama films
Italian black-and-white films
1950s Italian films